Yuri Eduardovich Loza (born February 1, 1954, in Sverdlovsk, Soviet Union) is a Russian singer, poet, and composer.

In 1983, he moved to Moscow with the purpose to enter the Russian Academy of Theatre Arts, but failed the entry exams and joined the rock band, Zodchiye. Soon his songs became the majority of the band's repertoire.

Since 1987, Loza has been singing solo.

In January 2023, Yuriy was on the list of people who fell under the new sanctions of Ukraine.

Discography
 1983 — Путешествие в рок-н-ролл (underground tape record)
 1984 — Огни эстрады
 1984 — Концерт для друзей
 1985 — Тоска
 1985 — Огни эстрады
 1986 — Любовь, любовь...
 1988 — Что сказано, то сказано
 1990 — Вся жизнь — дорога
 1994 — Для души
 1994 — Архив
 1995 — Для ума...
 1995 — Что сказано, то сказано (2CD)
 2000 — Заповедные места
 2001 — Любимые песни
 2002 — Компиляция в серии «Бульвар звезд»
 2002 — Компиляция в серии «Grand Collection»
 2002 — Компиляция в серии «Звездная серия»
 2004 — Запрещенные песни
 2004 — Я умею мечтать... (2CD)

References

External links
 last.fm

1954 births
Living people
Russian composers
Russian male composers
Russian male poets
Soviet male singers
20th-century Russian male singers
20th-century Russian singers
Russian chanson
Moscow State University of Economics, Statistics, and Informatics alumni
Russian conspiracy theorists